Althea Sealy (born December 26, 1960) is a Belizean ballerina who serves as the first Artistic Director of the Belize National Dance Company.

Early childhood and education 
Sealy was born in Belize City in 1960, and she danced in public for the first time when she was six years old. Sealy studied dance at St. Mary's Hall, later attending high school at Wesley College.

Dance career

Belize Creative Dancers 
In the 1980s, Althea Sealy founded the dance company Belize Creative Dancers alongside several other women. The group followed modern dance, Afro Caribbean dance, Latin dance, and other styles.

Belize National Dance Company 
Sealy has served as Artistic Director of the Belize National Dance Company since 1990, and she has been a principal dancer.

References 

Belizean ballet dancers
1960 births
Living people